Mea Tangi Me Ma'ara Joshua Ave (born 6 July 1998) is a New Zealand cricketer. 

Ave is of Cook Islands heritage. He has an honours degree in chemical engineering with a master's degree in dairy science and technology. He works as a researcher for Fonterra.

A right-handed batsman and wicket-keeper, Ave has played Hawke Cup cricket since 2014, first for Marlborough and more recently for Manawatu. He made his List A debut for Central Districts in the 2018–19 Ford Trophy on 24 October 2018. He made his first-class debut on 15 November 2021, for Central Districts in the 2021–22 Plunket Shield season. He made his Twenty20 debut on 31 December 2021, for Central Districts in the 2021–22 Super Smash. 

On 11 March 2022, Ave played a match for Otago as a temporary loan player due to Otago being affected by the ongoing COVID-19 pandemic. He replaced wicket-keeper Max Chu. Ave thus became the first player in the history of the Plunket Shield to represent two teams in the same season.

In August 2022, he was named in Cook Islands' Twenty20 International (T20I) squad for the 2022 ICC Men's T20 World Cup East Asia-Pacific Qualifier A in Vanuatu. He made his T20I debut on 9 September 2022 against Samoa.

References

External links
 

1998 births
Living people
New Zealand cricketers
Cook Island cricketers
Cook Islands Twenty20 International cricketers
Central Districts cricketers
Cricketers from Wellington City